Vinícius Nunes Rocha (born 30 March 1995) is a Brazilian futsal player who plays for S.L. Benfica and the Brazilian national futsal team as a pivot.

Honours
UEFA Futsal Champions League: 2018–19

References

External links
Liga Nacional de Futsal profile

1995 births
Living people
Futsal forwards
Sportspeople from São Paulo
Brazilian men's futsal players
Sporting CP futsal players
Brazilian expatriates in Portugal